Tiff Bluemle is an American politician and a member of the Democratic Party who has served in the Vermont House of Representatives since 2021.

Bluemle serves on the House Committee on General, Housing, and Military Affairs and as the Chair of the House Sexual Harassment Prevention Panel.

References

External links
 

21st-century American politicians
21st-century American women politicians
Living people
Democratic Party members of the Vermont House of Representatives
People from Burlington, Vermont
Women state legislators in Vermont
Year of birth missing (living people)
LGBT state legislators in Vermont